Engine Components International, Inc. (ECI) is a private aviation piston engine manufacturer. It was founded in 1943 as Pennington Channelcromium Co. to support the Army Air Force and Navy during World War II.

ECi certified its Quality Management System to the ISO 9001:2000 international standard and AS9100 aerospace standard. Recertified to the ISO 9001:2000 standard in Feb 2008.

Engines

External links
 Official Website

Aircraft engine manufacturers of the United States